Arabitol, or arabinitol, is a sugar alcohol. It can be formed by the reduction of either arabinose or lyxose. Some organic acid tests check for the presence of D-arabitol, which may indicate overgrowth of intestinal microbes such as Candida albicans or other yeast/fungus species.

References

External links

Sugar alcohols